Louise Romeike (born 19 August 1998) is a Swedish equestrian. She represented Sweden at the 2020 Summer Olympics and competed in Individual and Team Eventing on her horse Cato. She was eliminated from the competition during the cross country phase.

Romeike lives in Meyn, Germany with her husband, Claas Romeike, who owns her Olympic horse, Cato.

References 

1990 births
Living people
Swedish female equestrians
Olympic equestrians of Sweden
Equestrians at the 2020 Summer Olympics
People from Kävlinge Municipality
Swedish event riders
Sportspeople from Skåne County